Exhumed is a 2003 Canadian horror anthology film directed and written by Brian Clement.  Set in three different time periods and locales, the film tells the story of an artifact that can return the dead to life.

Plot 

In the first story, a samurai and a monk work together to defeat zombies in a Japanese forest.  In the second story, a female private detective discovers that the Japanese artifact is responsible for string of zombie attacks in the 1940s.  The third story is set in a post-apocalyptic wasteland where vampires and werewolves fight each other.  Humans capture them and force them to fight against zombies.

Cast

Reception 
In a mixed review, David Johnson of DVD Verdict called the film ambitious but flawed.  Michael Ferraro of Film Threat rated it 3.5/5 stars and wrote that it is worth viewing despite its flaws.  Peter Dendle wrote in The Zombie Movie Encyclopedia, Volume 2 that the film is creative but becomes increasingly lost amid the diverse characters and discourses.

References

External links 
 

2003 films
2003 horror films
Canadian independent films
English-language Canadian films
2000s Japanese-language films
Canadian zombie films
Films directed by Brian Clement
Canadian horror anthology films
Canadian vampire films
Canadian werewolf films
2003 independent films
2000s Canadian films